Henri Paul Royer (22 January 1869, Nancy – 31 October 1938, Neuilly-sur-Seine) was a French painter, remembered especially for his genre works from Brittany. A painter of genre, portraitist and landscape artist, he travelled both in America and Europe during his life.

Biography 

Henri Royer was the son of Jules Royer (1845-1900), the creator of one of the most important lithographic printing works established in Nancy in the rue de la Salpêtrière. Raised in the art world from a young age, Royer joined the Nancy School of Fine Arts where he met Émile Friant. He attended the classes of Antoine Vierling and Louis-Théodore Devilly and exhibited his first works at the Salon de Nancy, including Fight between two young typos and Young plasterer. These early successes prompted his parents and teachers to encourage a study trip to Holland with Friant, who then influenced Royer.

After his return in 1888, and after attending the École des Beaux-Arts in Paris, in 1890 he continued his studies at the Académie Julian under Jules Joseph Lefebvre and François Flameng. He exhibited regularly at the Paris Salon, specializing in genre paintings and portraits. As a portraitist, he encountered many famous figures from the aristocracy, politics, diplomacy, science and the arts. As a result, his critics described him as one of Ingres' disciples.

In 1896, together with his wife, he arrived in Brittany, where he was to spend long periods for the rest of his life, especially in and around Audierne. Unlike other artists, he was above all interested in the people rather than the scenery. In order to become closer to them, he even learnt to speak Breton. His paintings reveal careful attention to their costumes. A devout Catholic, he also painted religious subjects including solitary figures at prayer.

Royer taught at the Académie Julian and at the École des Beaux-Arts. Among his many students were Georgina and Lucilio de Albuquerque, Fréderic Fiebig, Jacques Majorelle, Thérèse Geraldy and Émile Louis Picault.

When the First World War broke out, he was first incorporated into the 41st Infantry Regiment. He was awarded the Croix de Guerre on 17 November 1915 and the Military Cross on 10 August 1916. Thereafter, he joined the 1st Regiment of Engineering camouflage section on 1 November 1916. His work was part of the painting event in the art competition at the 1932 Summer Olympics.

He was promoted to officer of the Legion of Honor on 11 August 1931. He died seven years later, on 31 October 1938.

Signature 
He signed his artwork Henri Royer.

Students 
A teacher at the Académie Julian in Paris and at the École des Beaux-Arts in Paris, Henri Royer had many students in his studio.

At the Académie Julian 
 
 Gustave Alaux (1887-1965)
 Georgina de Albuquerque (1885-1962)
 Raoul Barré (1896)
 Maurice Alexandre Berthon (1888-1914)
 Henri Blahay (1869-1941)
 Albert Braïtou-Sala (1885-1972)
 Étienne Buffet (1866-1948)
 Frédéric Fiebig (1885-1953)
 Thérèse Geraldy (1884-1965)
 Léonie Humbert-Vignot (1878-1960)
 Georges Lebacq (1876-1950)
 Jacques Majorelle (1886-1962)

Unlocated workshop 
 
 Lucílio de Albuquerque (1877-1939)
 Caroline Helena Armington (1875-1939)
 Frank Armington (1876-1941)
 Diógenes Campos Ayres (1881-1944)
 Jeanne-Marie Barbey (1876-1961)
 Teodoro Braga (1872-1935)
 Henri-Georges Bréard (1873-1950)
 Rodolfo Chambelland (1879-1967)
 Roberto Colin
 Frederick Garrison Hall (1879-1946)
 Mildred Jones (1899-1991)
 Chas Laborde (1886-1941)
 Eric Spencer Macky (1880-1958)
 Jeanne Louise Jacontot Mahudez (1876-1956)
 Marthe Orant (1874-1957)
 Émile Picault (1833-1915)
 André Prévot-Valéri (1890-1959)
 Jean Scherbeck (1898-1989)
 William Posey Silva (1859-1948)
 Henry Solon (1873-1958)
 Valle Júnior (1889-1958)

Expositions 
 In 2008, an exhibition was organized in Audierne to pay tribute to Royer.

References

Sources and bibliography

Bibliography 
 Le Pays lorrain / Henri Royer;  Garcot M., Gaudel H., Thiry J.;  Berger-Levrault, Nancy;  N°7 de juillet 1939;  ISSN 0031-3394
 Hommage de la Lorraine à la France : à l'occasion du bicentenaire de leur réunion, 1766-1966; Académie de Stanislas;  Berger-Levrault, Nancy;  1966;  (368 pages);  Notice n° : FRBNF31766545
 Gabriel P. Weisberg, Karal Ann Marling; Montmartre and the Making of Mass Culture; Rutgers University Press, London;  2001;  (296 pages);  
 Peinture et Art Nouveau: L'École de Nancy; Réunion des musées nationaux, Paris;  1999;  (159 pages);   
 Rothenstein, William;  Men and Memories, a History of the Arts 1872- 1922, Being the Recollections of William Rothenstein;  Tudor Pub. Co., New York;  1924;  OLC: 19014724, republished by Kessinger Publishing;  2005;  (504 pages);  
 Société des Artistes Français. Salon de 1928: Exposition Annuelle des Beaux-Arts, 1928.

19th-century French painters
French male painters
20th-century French painters
20th-century French male artists
1869 births
1938 deaths
Academic staff of the Académie Julian
Artists from Nancy, France
French genre painters
Olympic competitors in art competitions
19th-century French male artists